Sundarpur kathauli is a village, situated in Azamgarh district, Uttar Pradesh, India. It is situated on the bank of river 'Besav'. The neighbouring village of sundarpur kathauli are Dehduar, Lasnda khurd, Tirhautipir. The number of houses in this village is not very large. 'Rajju' and 'Bhelahiya' are two main ponds of this village. 75% population of village is literate. The per-capita income of the village is good.

The great Social Activist, Late Sh Ambika Singh facilitated to establish a primary school and constructed a bridge on River 'Besav' which is now a life line of the villagers. He did such several work for the Development of the Village. Sh Ambika Singh was the Gram Pradhan for (approximately) 50 years. Late Sh Ambika Singh and Late Sh Dharm Raj Singh, popularly known as "Pradhan Ji" & "Kaka" respectively were the friend, pholospher & guide of the villagers. They dedicated their life for the Development of Village. As a matter of fact they were the torch beare for the poor people of village.

Sh. Ramawadh Singh, a teacher, reformer and social activist of the village is always active for the Development of village.

Sh. Anil Kumar Singh, the first Science Graduate of the village and a Manager of a PSU Co. of India, assist Sh Ram Awadh Singh (Master jee) for his social and welfare activities from time to time.
"Jagat Basau Foundation", a charitable and non-profitable trust, organises free health camp every year for the villagers of the Kathauli and people of adjoining villages. The villagers derive strength from "Mahdev Baba, Kali Mai, Dih Baba and Brahm Baba" to whom they worship.

Mr. Ram Pyare Yadav is the Gram Pradhan for (approximately) 20 years 
He was the Gram Pradhan for three time (15 years) consecutive years.

Late Smt Kailashi Devi Is the Eldest Daughter in Law of Late Shri Ambika Singh Wife of Late Shri Chandrashekhar Singh Was popularly known as Badki Mai was responsible and Helpful to Many from this Village to Offer Shelter in Mumbai at Her Residence to Start their Career in Mumbai from This Village. She was Known for her Courage, Sympathy, and Love, for Under Privileged. She is the Only Lady who constructed Two Storey Apartment on her Own Which is Known As Kailashi Bhavan . She Lived Her Life Not Only For Herself But For Others too.

Mrs. Prema Yadav(Ram Pyare Yadav) is Present Gram Pradhan .

Villages in Azamgarh district